The Kangerluluk Range is a mountain range in the King Frederick VI Coast, southeastern Greenland. Administratively this range is part of the Kujalleq municipality.

This mountain group was named after Kangerluluk, the fjord flanking the range on the southern side. The area of the range is uninhabited.

Geography
The Kangerluluk Mountains are craggy and steep nunataks, relatively little glaciated in the eastern side and progressively rising less and less above the glaciers further inland until being engulfed by the Greenland ice sheet. The range runs roughly from east to west from Cape Olfert Fischer in the Irminger Sea coast, between Kangerluluk fjord in the south and Igutsaat Fjord in the north.

Peaks

See also
List of mountain ranges of Greenland
List of Nunataks§Greenland

References

External links
Aeromagnetic map of South Greenland 
Mafic igneous rocks and mineralisation in the Palaeoproterozoic Ketilidian orogen, South-East Greenland: project SUPRASYD 1996 - GEUS
Mountain ranges of Greenland
Nunataks of Greenland